Actors Centre Australia is a private, dramatic arts and acting school offering both certificate and degree level qualifications, based in Leichhardt, an Inner West suburb of Sydney, in New South Wales, Australia.

History
ACA was founded in 1987 by Dean Carey, then aged 27. He has remained associated with ACA since, while also having a varied national and international teaching, production, and performing career.

Patron
Hugh Jackman is Patron of ACA. He graduated from ACA's full-time acting course in 1991. Having established a national and international career, Jackman accepted the role of Patron in 2007 and continues to support the ACA.

Organisation
ACA is a trading name of the Australian registered company, ACA Sydney Pty Ltd ABN 13 601 586 467 which is also a Registered Training Organisation (RTO) (Code:45065).
 
Staff are organised as Executive Teaching, Teaching, and Operational staff.

The ACA's Forum Performance Precinct comprises: “The Italian Forum” - an open-air piazza and fountain; amphitheatre; a 300-seat versatile performance space; blackbox theatre; rehearsal rooms; conference facility; dance studio; licensed bar; demonstration kitchen; commercial kitchen; and, art gallery.

Courses
 Bachelor of Performing Arts (Stage and Screen) – 3 years (in association with Torrens University Australia)
 Masterclasses (Online via Zoom)
 Foundation Program - 5 months

Also offered, previously:
Advanced Diploma in Performing Arts, Acting – 2.5 years
10 Week Programs – Stage, Screen, Casting.

Festivals
The ACA organises or participates in several festivals, including:
 Sydney Science Fiction Film Festival
 Norton Street Italian Festa (postponed in 2020 due to COVID-19)

Alumni
Hugh Jackman, 1991

References

External links
ACA website

Drama schools in Australia
Film schools in Australia
Education in Sydney
Theatres in Sydney
Educational institutions established in 1987
1987 establishments in Australia
Australian tertiary institutions